Gambols is an English country dance created by Jenna Simpson for four couples.

Tune 

"The Shepherd and Shepherdess", JJo8.027

Instructions 

Instructions for Gambols are published on Colin Hume's website.

External links 
 "Gambols" at Colin Hume's website
 "Gambols" at the Cambridge folk home page
 
 "The Shepherd and the Sheperdess / Scotch Jenny" at the Vaughan Williams Memorial Library

References 

English country dance
Partner dance
Dance forms in classical music